Circuit training is a form of body conditioning that involves endurance training, resistance training, high-intensity aerobics, and exercises performed in a circuit, similar to high-intensity interval training. It targets strength building and muscular endurance. An exercise "circuit" is one completion of all set exercises in the program. When one circuit is completed, one begins the first exercise again for the next circuit. Traditionally, the time between exercises in circuit training is short and often with rapid movement to the next exercise.

The program was developed by R.E. Morgan and G.T. Anderson in 1953 at the University of Leeds in England.

Typical activities in a circuit training
A circuit should work each sections of the body individually. Typical activities include:

Upper-body 
Push ups
Bench dips
Back extensions
Medicine ball chest pass
Bench press
Inclined press up
Core & trunk
Sit ups (lower abdominal)
Stomach crunch (upper abdominal)
Back extension chest raise
Lower-body
Squat jumps
Compass jumps
Astride jumps
Step ups
Shuttle runs
Hopping shuttles
Bench squats
Total-body
Burpees
Treadmills
Squat thrusts
Skipping
Jogging

Effects of circuit training
Studies at Baylor University and The Cooper Institute show that circuit training is the most time-efficient way to enhance cardiovascular fitness and muscle endurance. Studies show that circuit training helps women to achieve their goals and maintain them longer than other forms of exercise or diet.

A summary of one study noted the following:

One advantage is that reduced station times will encourage the participants to lift heavier weights, which means they can achieve overload with smaller number of repetitions: typically in the range of 25 to 50 depending on their training goals.

See also
 Bodyweight exercise
 Threshold training
 Calisthenics
 General fitness training
 High-intensity interval training
 Interval training
 Isometric exercise
 Long slow distance
Power training
 Plyometric
 Resistance training
 Stretching
 Supercompensation
 Weight training
 vVO2max

References 

 Kravitz, L. (1996). "The fitness professional's complete guide to circuits and intervals". IDEA Today, 14(1), 32–43.
 

Strength training
Physical exercise

pl:Trening obwodowy